Mansuphantes is a genus of dwarf spiders that was first described by Michael I. Saaristo & A. V. Tanasevitch in 1996.

Species
 it contains twelve species:
Mansuphantes arciger (Kulczyński, 1882) – Europe
Mansuphantes aridus (Thorell, 1875) – Switzerland, Austria, Italy
Mansuphantes auruncus (Brignoli, 1979) – Italy
Mansuphantes fragilis (Thorell, 1875) – Europe, Turkey
Mansuphantes korgei (Saaristo & Tanasevitch, 1996) – Turkey
Mansuphantes mansuetus (Thorell, 1875) (type) – Europe
Mansuphantes ovalis (Tanasevitch, 1987) – Russia, Georgia, Azerbaijan
Mansuphantes parmatus (Tanasevitch, 1990) – Russia, Azerbaijan
Mansuphantes pseudoarciger (Wunderlich, 1985) – France, Switzerland, Italy
Mansuphantes rectilamellus (Deltshev, 1988) – Macedonia, Bulgaria
Mansuphantes rossii (Caporiacco, 1927) – Austria, Italy
Mansuphantes simoni (Kulczyński, 1894) – Western Europe

See also
 List of Linyphiidae species (I–P)

References

Araneomorphae genera
Linyphiidae
Spiders of Asia